Linxi County (Mongolian:    Linsi siyan) is a county of eastern Inner Mongolia, People's Republic of China. It is under the administration of Chifeng City,  to the south-southeast.

Climate
Linxi County has a dry, monsoon-influenced humid continental climate (Köppen Dwb), with very cold and dry winters, hot, somewhat humid summers, and strong winds, especially in spring. With monthly percent possible sunshine ranging from 54% in July to 74% in February, sunshine is abundant year-round, there are 2,949 hours of bright sunshine annually.

References
www.xzqh.org

External links

County-level divisions of Inner Mongolia
Chifeng